Action at Angaur is a 1945 short documentary film created by the United States War Department during World War II. The film was created for the 7th War Loan drive and documents the untried 81st Infantry "Wildcat" Division in the Battle of Angaur in the Palau Islands.

References

External links
 

1945 films
American World War II propaganda shorts
American short documentary films
American black-and-white films
1945 documentary films
Black-and-white documentary films
Articles containing video clips
United States government films
1940s short documentary films
1940s English-language films
1940s American films